A fougasse  is an improvised mortar constructed by making a hollow in the ground or rock and filling it with explosives (originally, black powder) and projectiles. The fougasse was used by Samuel Zimmermann at Augsburg in the sixteenth century, referred to by Vauban in the seventeenth century, and well known to military engineers by the mid-eighteenth century. This technique was used in several European wars, the American Revolution, and the American Civil War. The term is still used to describe such devices.

Firing 
The normal method of firing was to use a burning torch or slow match to ignite a saucisson (French for "sausage", a cloth or leather tube waterproofed with pitch and filled with black powder) leading to the main charge. This had numerous disadvantages; the firer was obvious to the attacking enemy, and had to run to get clear after lighting the fuse. The black powder was also very susceptible to moisture, and might not work at all. In 1573 Samuel Zimmermann devised an improved method which incorporated a snaphance (or later, flintlock mechanism) into the charge and connected its trigger to the surface with a wire. This was more resistant to moisture, better concealed and enabled the firer to be further away. It also enabled the fougasse to be tripwire activated, turning it into an anti-personnel fragmentation mine.

In a letter to his sister, Colonel Hugh Robert Hibbert described such a weapon employed during the Crimean War:

Types 
There are several variants according to the material projected by the explosion.

Stone 
The most common type in early use was the stone fougasse, which was a hole simply filled with large rocks and bricks. When fired, it would scatter a hail of fast-moving stones across the area to its front. Large stone fougasses might hold several tons of rubble and as much as a hundredweight of powder.

Shell 
The shell fougasse was loaded with early black powder mortar shells (essentially a large version of an early black powder hand grenade) or incendiary "carcasses". When fired, the powder charge would throw out the shells and ignite their fuses, so the projectiles would be scattered across the target area and then begin exploding, filling the area with fragmentation or flame from all directions in an effect similar to a cluster bomb.

Flame 

A flame fougasse was a similar weapon in which the projectile was an inflammable liquid, typically a mixture of petrol (gasoline) and oil. The flame fougasse was developed by the British Petroleum Warfare Department in response to the threat of German invasion during World War II.

In Britain, during WWII, the flame fougasse was usually constructed from a 40-gallon drum dug into the roadside and camouflaged. It would be placed at a location such as a corner, steep incline or roadblock where vehicles would be obliged to slow down. Initially a mixture of 40% petrol and 60% gas oil was used; this was later replaced by an adhesive gel of tar, lime and petrol known as 5B.

The November 1944 issue of the US War Department Intelligence Bulletin refers to 'Fougasse flame throwers' used in the Russian defence at Stalingrad being the basis of a German version found in Italy that were buried with a fixed direction discharge tube and integrated with conventional landmines and barbed wire in defense works. The German weapon, the Abwehrflammenwerfer 42 had an 8-gallon fuel tank and the seven in the installation were wired back to a control point and could be fired individually or together.

The flame fougasse has remained in army field manuals as a battlefield expedient. Such expedients are constructed from available fuel containers combined with standard explosive charges or hand grenades triggered electrically or by lengths of detonating cord. Some designs use lengths of detonating cord or blasting caps to rupture the fuel container as well as detonate the main charge. Weapons of this sort were widely used in the Korean and Vietnam wars as well as other conflicts.

See also
 M18 Claymore mine
 Improvised explosive device

Notes

References

Hayward, James. The Bodies on the Beach — Sealion, Shingle Street and the Burning Sea Myth of 1940. CD41 Publishing, 2001 .
FM 20–33. Combat Flame Operations. Headquarters Department of the Army, Washington, June 1967.

External links

Land mines
Incendiary weapons
Explosive weapons